Edmund Chilmead (1610 – 19 February 1654) was an English writer and translator, who produced both scholarly works and hack-writing. He is also known as a musician.

Life
He was born in 1610 at Stow-on-the-Wold, Gloucestershire. 
He studied at Magdalen College, Oxford, where he graduated M.A. in 1631. He became a chaplain (canon) of Christ Church, Oxford, in 1632, from where he was ejected in 1648.

Chilmead died on 19 February 1653-4 in London, and was buried in the churchyard of St Botolph's Aldersgate.

Works
He produced the editio princeps of the Chronographia of Malalas. He translated:

Robert Hues's  (A Learned Treatise of Globes, 1639)
the De Monarchia Hispanica of Tommaso Campanella (Discourse Touching the Spanish Monarchy, 1654)
Jacques Ferrand on 'erotic melancholy',
the Riti Ebraici of Leon of Modena (' 1650)
the Curiositez of Jacques Gaffarel, (Unheard-of Curiosities Concerning the Talismanical Sculpture of the Persians, 1650)
and other works. He produced a catalogue of the Greek manuscripts in the Bodleian Library. He was a clerical defender of astrology, in his translation of Gaffarel.

Anthony Wood described him as "a choice mathematician, a noted critic, and one that understood several tongues, especially the Greek, very well" (Wood, Ath. Oxon., 3.350–51)

Notes

ReferencesConcise Dictionary of National BiographyMordechai Feingold, Penelope M. Gouk, An early critique of Bacon's Sylva Sylvarum: Edmund Chilmead's treatise on sound'', Annals of Science, Volume 40, Issue 2 March 1983, pp. 139–157

1610 births
1654 deaths
English classical scholars
People from Stow-on-the-Wold